The 46th G7 summit of the leaders of the Group of Seven was originally scheduled for June 10–12, 2020, at Camp David, United States. However, the summit was canceled due to the COVID-19 pandemic.

Planned venue

Attempt to hold summit at Trump resort
The choice of the summit's location was controversial.  The Secret Service initially vetted ten sites for the summit and reduced that list to four (in Hawaii, Utah, California, and North Carolina).  They then eliminated the California and North Carolina sites, and added, at United States president Donald Trump's direction, the option of hosting at Trump National Doral in Miami. 

On October 17, 2019, Trump's acting White House Chief of Staff Mick Mulvaney announced the summit would be held at the Trump National Doral, dismissing concerns about potential conflict of interests and the prospect of a president personally profiting from an official event. Trump initially touted the benefits of using his resort for the conference and called the selection "something very good for our Country" but, two days later, after bipartisan criticism, announced that the G7 summit would no longer be held at Doral, blaming "Media & Democrat Crazed and Irrational Hostility" on his Twitter account.  

At the time of the announcement, Trump was the target of two lawsuits—D.C. and Maryland v. Trump and CREW v. Trump—alleging that he was violating the U.S. Constitution's foreign and domestic emoluments clauses because of payments received from the Saudi government and other foreign governments for stays at his Trump International Hotel in Washington, D.C. Legal experts debated whether hosting the G7 at a Trump-owned property would violate the Constitution's emoluments clauses.

Selection of Camp David

On December 3, 2019, it was announced that the summit would be held at Camp David, the country retreat of the President of the United States.  The same venue hosted the group's 38th summit in 2012.

Postponements and Cancellation
In response to the coronavirus pandemic, Trump canceled the G7 at Camp David and said that the meeting would be conducted by video conference, as in the case of a G7 session held on 16 April 2020. Later, however, Trump suggested that the G7 could be held in person at the White House or Camp David.  In late May 2020, German Chancellor Angela Merkel declined Trump's invitation to attend a G7 summit in late June, citing the ongoing coronavirus pandemic.  French President Emmanuel Macron, who is closely aligned with Merkel, made a phone call to Trump stating that the entire G7 should be present in person at a summit. British Prime Minister Boris Johnson also suggested that he favored an in-person gathering. On May 30, 2020, Trump delayed the summit until at least September 2020.

In August 2020, Trump said that he wanted to delay the summit until after the November 2020 election. No summit took place subsequently.

Invitees
Trump named India, Australia, Brazil, South Korea, and Russia as potential invitees to the summit, and said "I don't feel that as a G7 it properly represents what's going on in the world. It's a very outdated group of countries." Trump's aides said that China would be a subject of G7+ discussions, but not a part of it, and said that Trump intended to use the summit to build an anti-China bloc.

In calls with Trump in early June 2020, invitations to join the summit were accepted by Australian Prime Minister Scott Morrison, Brazilian President Jair Bolsonaro, South Korean President Moon Jae-in, and Indian Prime Minister Narendra Modi.

Trump's proposed invitation to Russian President Vladimir Putin
On June 2, 2020, Trump initiated a call with Russian President Vladimir Putin offering to invite him to the G7 meeting. (Russia was admitted to the G7 in 1997, but was expelled from the group in 2014 due to its aggressive actions, including the annexation of Crimea.) However, Trump's proposal to invite Putin was staunchly opposed by the UK and Canada. Canadian Prime Minister Justin Trudeau said that Russia's "continued disrespect and flaunting of international rules and norms is why it remains outside of the G7 and why it will continue to remain out" and a spokesman for the British government said that Russia should not be readmitted to the group "unless it ceases aggressive and destabilizing activity that threatens the safety of UK citizens and the collective security of our allies." 

The European Union agreed that Russia should not be readmitted to the G7, with EU chief diplomat Josep Borrell, the High Representative of the EU for Foreign Affairs and Security Policy, explaining that Trump did not have the unilateral power to change the permanent membership of the G7 or its scope: "The prerogative of the G7 chair, in this case the United States, is to issue guest invitations -- guest invitations reflect the host's priorities. But changing membership, changing the format on a permanent basis, is not a prerogative of the G7 chair."

On August 10, 2020, Trump said that he had not decided whether to invite Putin, but this eventually became a moot point as the summit did not proceed.

Participants
The planned 46th G7 summit would have been the final summit for Japanese Prime Minister Shinzō Abe, U.S. President Donald Trump and Italian Prime Minister Giuseppe Conte. However, it was ultimately cancelled due to the COVID-19 pandemic. Abe handed over the power to Yoshihide Suga on September 16, 2020; Trump handed over the power to Joe Biden on January 20, 2021; and Conte handed over the power to Mario Draghi on February 13, 2021.

Participants would have included the leaders of the G7 member states as well as representatives of the European Union. The President of the European Commission has been a permanently welcome participant, not a Nation member per se, at all meetings and decision-making since 1981.

Agenda

Climate change
Trump did not take part in the climate change mitigation discussions during the 44th meetings held in Canada or the 45th meetings held in France.  When the administration announced that the 46th meetings were to be held at the Trump property in Florida, Trump's acting White House Chief of Staff Mick Mulvaney said, "climate change will not be on the agenda." President Trump's position on the 2015 Paris Climate Accord became stronger at the 2020 G20 meeting, following his US election defeat in November 2020.

References

2020
2020 conferences
2020 in international relations
2020 in Maryland
2020 in American politics
Diplomatic conferences in the United States
21st-century diplomatic conferences (Global)
June 2020 events in the United States
Cancelled events in the United States
Events cancelled due to the COVID-19 pandemic
Impact of the COVID-19 pandemic on politics
Impact of the COVID-19 pandemic in the United States